Keenan Robinson (born July 7, 1989) is a former American football linebacker. He played college football for the University of Texas, and was selected by the Washington Redskins in the fourth round of the 2012 NFL Draft. He also played for the New York Giants and the Buffalo Bills.

Early life
Born in Omaha, Nebraska, Robinson attended Plano East Senior High School in Plano, Texas, where he played football and ran track. In football, he played linebacker and defensive end, recording 273 career tackles with nine tackles for loss, five sacks, five forced fumbles, five fumble recoveries, six PBU, an interception, and a blocked punt. He was named an All-American by USA Today and Parade in 2006.

In track & field, Robinson was a two-time letterman, and was one of the state's top performers in the triple jump. He won the district triple jump championship as a junior. He got top-jumps of 6.71 meters (21 ft 11 in) in the long jump and 13.88 meters (45 ft 5 in) in the triple jump as a senior. In addition, he ran a 4.5 40-yard dash, bench-pressed 280 pounds and squatted 450 pounds.

Recruiting
Regarded as a four-star recruit by Rivals.com, Robinson was listed as the No. 4 outside linebacker prospect in the class of 2007. He chose Texas over scholarship offers from  Oklahoma State and Texas A&M, among others.

College career

Robinson redshirted his initial year at Texas and spent the 2008 season mostly on special teams. As a sophomore, he started 14 games at outside linebacker and earned an honorable mention All-Big 12 selection.

In 2011, Keenan was initiated into the Iota Delta chapter of Kappa Alpha Psi fraternity at the University of Texas at Austin.

Professional career

Washington Redskins
Robinson was drafted in the fourth round of 2012 NFL Draft by the Washington Redskins. Defensive coordinator, Jim Haslett, announced that Robinson will switch from the outside linebacker position to inside linebacker. On May 17, 2012, he officially signed with the Redskins to a four-year contract. He suffered a tear in his right pectoral muscle in the Week 12 win against the Dallas Cowboys on Thanksgiving. On November 26, 2012, Robinson was placed on injured reserve. Serving as a back-up to Perry Riley and on special teams, he recorded a total of 11 tackles.

On July 26, 2013, it was announced Robinson tore his left pectoral muscle the first day of training camp for the 2013 season and had expected to be inactive for three to five months. He was officially placed on injured reserve for the second year in a row on August 26.

Robinson became a starter for the 2014 season, following the retirement of London Fletcher. In Week 1 of the 2014 season, he made his first career NFL start, a 17-6 loss against the Houston Texans, in which he recorded a total of 6 tackles. During the Week 4 45-14 loss against the New York Giants, Robinson recorded his first career interception off an Eli Manning pass that was knocked out of the hands of Giants receiver Rueben Randle by Redskins safety Brandon Meriweather, and was then picked off by Robinson. He had also recorded a total of 13 tackles in that game. In a Week 7 19-17 win against the Tennessee Titans, Robinson recorded a career-high 14 total tackles. He was named NFC Defensive Player of the Week for his performance. On Veterans Day 2014, Robinson received the Ed Block Courage Award as he was the Redskins' recipient for the annual award.

In a Week 4, 2015 game against the New England Patriots, Robinson recorded his second career interception against Tom Brady.

New York Giants
On March 10, 2016, Robinson signed a one-year contract with the New York Giants.

On March 21, 2017, Robinson re-signed with the Giants. He was placed on injured reserve on November 14, 2017 after suffering a quad injury in Week 9.

Buffalo Bills
On July 24, 2018, Robinson signed with the Buffalo Bills.

On August 23, 2018, Robinson announced his retirement from the NFL.

References

External links

 
  
 

1989 births
Living people
Plano East Senior High School alumni
Sportspeople from Plano, Texas
Players of American football from Texas
American football linebackers
Texas Longhorns football players
Washington Redskins players
New York Giants players
Buffalo Bills players
Ed Block Courage Award recipients